UNF may refer to:

Technology
 Unified fine thread, screw thread series
 Unnormalized form, a database data model

Organizations
 UniFirst, a supplier of uniforms
 United National Front (Afghanistan)
 United National Front (Sri Lanka)
 United Nations Foundation, a fund-raising organization
 University of North Florida, Jacksonville, US
 , the Danish Youth Association of Science
 ,  a Swedish youth temperance organisation
  or National Fascist Union, Argentina, 1936-1939
  or National University of Formosa, Argentina